The 2002 Michigan Attorney General election was held on November 5, 2002. Incumbent Democratic Attorney General Jennifer Granholm chose not to seek re-election and instead successfully ran for governor. Republican nominee Mike Cox defeated Democratic nominee Gary Peters with 48.86% of the vote in a close race decided by less than 6,000 votes. Cox became the first Republican to win the Attorney General office in Michigan since Frank Millard did so in 1950.

General election

Candidates
Major party candidates
Mike Cox, Republican
Gary Peters, Democratic

Other candidates
Jerry Kaufman, Green
Gerald Van Sickle, U.S. Taxpayers

Results

References

Attorney General
Michigan Attorney General elections
November 2002 events in the United States
Michigan